Linda Schreiber Braidwood (October 9, 1909 – January 15, 2003) was an American archaeologist and pre-historian. She and her husband discovered the oldest known piece of cloth and some of the earliest known copper tools.

References

1909 births
2003 deaths
People from Grand Rapids, Michigan
University of Chicago alumni
University of Michigan alumni
20th-century American women scientists
American women archaeologists
American expatriates in Syria
American expatriates in Iraq
American expatriates in Turkey
20th-century American women writers
20th-century American archaeologists
Historians from Michigan
21st-century American women